UFC Fight Night: Iaquinta vs. Cowboy (also known as UFC Fight Night 151 or UFC on ESPN+ 9) was a mixed martial arts event produced by the Ultimate Fighting Championship held on May 4, 2019 at the Canadian Tire Centre in Ottawa, Ontario, Canada.

Background
The event was the promotion's second visit to Ottawa, following UFC Fight Night: MacDonald vs. Thompson which took place in June 2016 at TD Place Arena.

A lightweight bout between Al Iaquinta and former UFC Lightweight Championship challenger Donald Cerrone served as the event headliner.

A heavyweight bout between Walt Harris and Aleksei Oleinik  was originally scheduled to take place at this event. However on April 3, it was announced that Oleinik would be replacing former Bellator Heavyweight Champion Alexander Volkov against the 2010 K-1 World Grand Prix Champion and former Strikeforce Heavyweight Champion Alistair Overeem in the main event of UFC on ESPN+ 7. He was replaced by Sergey Spivak.

Leah Letson was expected to face Sarah Moras at the event. However, Letson was removed from the fight in early April for an unspecified medical issue and was replaced by Macy Chiasson.

Brian Kelleher was expected to face Mitch Gagnon at the event. However, Kelleher pulled out of the fight on April 10 citing injury and was replaced by promotional newcomer Cole Smith.

A welterweight bout between Siyar Bahadurzada and Nordine Taleb was scheduled to take place at the event. However on April 24, it was reported that Bahadurzada pulled out of the bout citing injury and was replaced by newcomer Kyle Prepolec.

Results

Bonus awards
The following fighters received $50,000 bonuses:
Fight of the Night: Donald Cerrone vs. Al Iaquinta
Performance of the Night: Walt Harris and Macy Chiasson

See also 

 List of UFC events
 2019 in UFC
 List of current UFC fighters

References 

UFC Fight Night
2019 in mixed martial arts
May 2019 sports events in Canada
Mixed martial arts in Canada
Sports competitions in Ottawa
2019 in Ontario